Kuki can refer to:

Locations
 Kuki, Isfahan, a village in Isfahan Province, Iran
 Kuki, Saitama, a city in Japan

Peoples and culture
 Kuki, or Thadou people, an ethnic tribe native to northeastern India (also Burma, where they are called Chin)
 Kukish languages spoken by the Kuki and related peoples
 Kuki (pie), a staple in Kurdish cuisine
 Kuki, an ancient samurai family of fighting style called Kukishin ryu

Technology
 Kuki Linux, a distribution based on Ubuntu, made for the Acer Aspire One
 Kuki (chatbot), a Loebner Prize-winning chatbot
 Kuki Inc., a Japanese adult video company

Other
 Kuki Sanban (Numbuh 3), a fictional character in the animated series Codename: Kids Next Door
 Kuki (footballer, born 1971), Brazilian footballer
 Kuki (footballer, born 1994), Spanish footballer
 Kuki (rapper), Polish rapper

KUKI can refer to:
 KUKI (AM), a radio station (1400 AM) licensed to Ukiah, California, United States
 KUKI-FM, a radio station (103.3 FM) licensed to Ukiah, California, United States
 KUKI, the ICAO code for Ukiah Municipal Airport

Language and nationality disambiguation pages